A Time of Changes is the debut studio album by the British heavy metal band Blitzkrieg, released in 1985.

History
This album came out when Brian Ross decided to reform Blitzkrieg and record the album they wanted to record before their split-up in 1981. After the original split of Blitzkrieg, Ross sang with Avenger, Satan and Lonewolf. "Pull the Trigger" is in fact a Satan song that wasn't featured on their first album Court in the Act. Ross recorded it with Satan, and it appeared on an earlier demo, Into the Fire. Satan guitarist Russ Tippins makes a guest appearance on the song. "Take a Look Around" was recorded during these sessions and intended to be used on a single, but that never materialized. It is added as track six (4:14) on the A Time of Changes – Phase 1 compilation. The crowd noise on "Hell to Pay" was lifted from a Queen concert as a joke on the rumors that the Blitzed Alive tape was a fake live show. At the time of its release most people believed "Hell to Pay" was actually recorded live.

The original 1985 album was never released outside of the UK on vinyl, though it was released in Japan on CD in 1990 by Neat Records/Teichiku Records Japan (TECP-25355) under the title A Time of Changes + More with two bonus tracks and subsequently by Castle in 1992 under the original title. The two extra tracks are from the original first 1981 release of the single "Buried Alive", which features "Blitzkrieg" on the "B-side". This version of "Blitzkrieg" differs from the release on the 1985 album and is most notable as the version which Metallica used to play in their early years and based their 1984 cover version on.

Track listing

Personnel 
Blitzkrieg
Brian Ross – vocals, producer, keyboards on tracks 7 and 8
Mick Procter – lead guitar
Jim Sirotto – rhythm guitar
Mick Moore – bass guitar
Sean Taylor – drums

Additional musicians
Ian Boddy – keyboards on track 1
Russ Tippins - guitar on track 4

Production
Martin Smith – producer, engineer

References

1985 debut albums
Blitzkrieg (band) albums